Adolph J. Lewandowski (May 30, 1905 – November 18, 1961) was an American football and basketball player and coach.  He served as the head football coach at the University of Nebraska–Lincoln from 1943 to 1944, compiling a record of 4–12.  Lewandowski was the head basketball coach at the University of Montana from 1932 to 1937 and at Nebraska from 1940 to 1945, amassing a career college basketball record of 81–125.  He was also the head baseball coach at Nebraska for one season in 1942, tallying a mark of 3–1.

In 1961, he died of a heart ailment at the age of 56.

Head coaching record

Football

References

External links
 Nebraska profile
 

1905 births
1961 deaths
American football ends
American men's basketball players
Basketball coaches from Illinois
Basketball players from Chicago
Montana Grizzlies football coaches
Montana Grizzlies basketball coaches
Nebraska Cornhuskers athletic directors
Nebraska Cornhuskers baseball coaches
Nebraska Cornhuskers football coaches
Nebraska Cornhuskers football players
Nebraska Cornhuskers men's basketball coaches
Nebraska Cornhuskers men's basketball players
Sportspeople from Chicago
Players of American football from Chicago